Ohio State Route 607 (SR 607) was a north–south state highway in the southern portion of the U.S. state of Ohio.  Its southern terminus was on the East Huntington Bridge over the Ohio River at the West Virginia state line near Proctorville where West Virginia Route 106 continues south. SR 607's northern terminus was at SR 7 and SR 243 west of Proctorville.

Route description
The majority of SR 607 was on the East Huntington Bridge. The route started at the Ohio–West Virginia state line over the Ohio River. Less than  later, the route curved to the south and ended at SR 7 and SR 243 near Proctorville.

History
The East Huntington Bridge was built in 1985, and a year later, SR 607 was designated.

Chesapeake Bypass and State Route 607T

As a part of the Chesapeake Bypass project, SR 607 was temporarily extended north of SR 7 and SR 243 along a new bypass alignment to Irene Road in 2004. The extension was known as SR 607T. In 2006, SR 7 was moved onto this road and SR 775 was extended south to replace SR 607.

Major intersections

References

607
Transportation in Lawrence County, Ohio